Hippolytus may refer to:

People 
Hippolytus (Greek myth), several people
Hippolytus of Rome (c. 170–c. 235), Christian writer and saint
Hippolytus of Thebes (fl. 7th/8th century), Byzantine chronographer
Hippolytus (archbishop of Gniezno) (died c. 1027)
Hippolytus, Bishop of Vác (died after 1157), Hungarian prelate

Literary works based on the Greek myth 
 Hippolytus (play), a tragedy by Euripides
 Phaedra (Seneca), sometimes known as Hippolytus, play by Seneca the Younger 
 A character in Jean Racine's play Phèdre

Other 
 Hippolytus and Aricia by Jean-Philippe Rameau
 Hippolytus a Greek non profit organisation for the preservation and cultural promotion of the Skyros Pony.